Laces is a 2018 Israeli drama film directed by Jacob Goldwasser. In July 2018, it was one of five films nominated for the Ophir Award for Best Picture.

Cast
 Doval'e Glickman as Ruven
 Evelin Hagoel as Ilana
 Nevo Kimchi as Gadi
 Yafit Asulin as Rita
 Dror Keren as Yehuda

References

External links
 

2018 films
2018 drama films
Israeli drama films
2010s Hebrew-language films